Freezing is an anime series adapted from the manga of the same title written by Dall-Young Lim and illustrated by Kwang-Hyun Kim. Set in a slightly futuristic world, Earth has been invaded and is at war with aliens from another dimension called the Nova. In order to counter them, genetically modified girls with super fighting skills called Pandoras and their male partners called Limiters who use special "freezing" powers to limit their opponent's mobility are made to fight against the Nova. The series focuses on Kazuya Aoi, a Limiter whose late sister was a Pandora, and Satellizer el Bridget, a powerful Pandora with a cold personality. Both are enrolled at the West Genetics Academy in which Pandoras and Limiters are trained. The plot follows Kazuya's friendship with Satellizer, the students of the Academy, and Earth's ongoing war against the Nova.

The anime was produced by A.C.G.T. and is directed by Takashi Watanabe, written by Masanao Akahoshi and Takao Yoshioka, and features music by Masaru Yokoyama, direction by Shinsaku Tanaka and Takashi Tachizaki, character design by Mayumi Watanabe, and art and sound direction by Satoru Kuwabara and Koji Tsujitani, respectively. The anime's first season aired on AT-X between January 8, 2011 and April 7, 2011, with subsequent runs on Chiba TV, Sun TV, Tokyo MX, TV Aichi, TV Kanagawa and TV Saitama. The show aired uncensored in 4:3 format on AT-X, while the airing on Tokyo MX (which began on January 9) and other channels were in 16:9 widescreen format and heavily censored. Six DVD and Blu-ray volumes were released by Media Factory between March 23 and August 24, 2011, each volume containing two episodes and original video animation called , as well as other bonus material. The anime was licensed in North America by Funimation Entertainment for simulcasting (in its 16:9 edited format) on their video portal. Funimation later gained additional licensing rights to the series and released it in 2012 on DVD and Blu-ray. A second season titled "Freezing Vibration", began airing on AT-X on October 4, 2013. From December 25, 2013 to May 28, 2014, Freezing Vibration will be released in DVD and Blu-ray with OVA specials and CD dramas included.

A CD single containing the two songs was released by Media Factory on February 23, 2011.

Episode list

Season 1 (Freezing)

Season 2 (Freezing Vibration)

OVA episodes

Season 1 (Freezing)

Season 2 (Freezing Vibration)

Notes

References

External links
 Freezing official website 
 

Freezing